Burnel Okana-Stazi (born July 10, 1983 in Gamboma) is a Congolese football player for Pattani in the Thai League 3.

Career
In 2005, he moved to FC Stal Alchevsk. After two and a half seasons with FC Stal Alchevsk he left the club, before he returning in June 2009. In 2014, he left Ukrainian club and went free agent but soon he had some trials in different countries include Uzbekistan Premier League side Mash’al Mubarek but could not get contract because of knee injury. After a half-year without a club Okana Stazi has signed one-year contract for Lao Premier League club Lane Xang Intra F.C.after he signed one more contract with EDL FC the Current team.

International career
Okana-Stazi made his first cap for Congo national football team in the World Cup qualifying match against Mali on 7 September 2008.

External links
 

1983 births
Living people
People from Plateaux Department (Republic of the Congo)
Republic of the Congo footballers
Republic of the Congo international footballers
Association football forwards
FC Stal Alchevsk players
Ukrainian Premier League players
Ukrainian First League players
Republic of the Congo expatriate footballers
Expatriate footballers in Ukraine
Republic of the Congo expatriate sportspeople in Ukraine
Expatriate footballers in Laos
Expatriate footballers in Thailand
Lanexang United F.C. players
Belarusian First League players
Lao Premier League players
Burnel Okana-Stazi